Hakea rhombales, commonly known as walukara, is a shrub in the family Proteacea. It has red, pink or purple flowers and is endemic to Western Australia and the Northern Territory.

Description
It blooms from April to September and produces red-pink-purple flowers.

The branchlets and young leaves are appressed-pubescent with ferruginous hairs but otherwise glabrescent.

The fruit are black-pusticulate with a toothed crest found on either side of suture.

Taxonomy and naming
Hakea rhombales was first formally described by the botanist Ferdinand von Mueller in 1876 in Fragmenta Phytographiae Australiae. The name of the species is from the Latin word rhombus referring to the shape of the wing on the seed.

Distribution and habitat
Walukara has a scattered distribution through area in the Pilbara and the Goldfields regions of Western Australia where it is found on sand dunes, plains and hillsides growing in sandy or loamy soils. Its range extends east into the Northern Territory to around the Petermann Range.

Conservation status
Hakea rhombales is classified as "not threatened" by the Western Australian Government Department of Parks and Wildlife.

References

rhombales
Eudicots of Western Australia
Flora of the Northern Territory
Plants described in 1876
Taxa named by Ferdinand von Mueller